Tulsky (Edžərqoeẑ) is a rural locality (a settlement) and the administrative center of Maykopsky District in the Republic of Adygea, Russia, located on the right bank of the Belaya River (Kuban's tributary)  south of Maykop. Population:  10,502 (2002 Census);

History
Urban-type settlement status was granted to then-stanitsa of Tulskaya in 1963 in anticipation of the settlement's industrial growth. In April 2011, a referendum was planned to decide whether Tulsky should be demoted to a rural locality—a move that would allow the population to receive some benefits from the social programs specific to rural areas, as well as to lower the utility costs. The results were in favor, and by the Law of November 2, 2011 Tulsky was formally demoted to rural status.

Culture
There is a museum of local history in the settlement.

Tulsky hosted the 15th Regional Festival of Cossack culture in 2006.

References

External links
Official website of Zhernoklev Spouses Museum of Local History of Tulsky 

Rural localities in Maykopsky District